Tray Chaney is an American actor. He appeared on the HBO program The Wire as Poot Carr, which became his most successful acting role. He also appears in the Bounce TV soap opera Saints & Sinners as Kendrick.

Career 
Chaney began his entertainment career as a dancer at the age of four winning competitions at the Apollo Theater. He appeared in the 2003 music video "My Baby" by rap artist Bow Wow. He later appeared in The Wire BET Promo Shoot commercial in 2006. He has also appeared on America's Most Wanted, playing a fugitive named "Jerry Robinson." 

He released his self-published book entitled The Truth You Can't beTray in January 2007.

Personal life 
Chaney grew up in Forestville, Maryland and lives with his wife in Clinton, Maryland.

Filmography

Film

Television

References

External links
"After The Wire", Christopher Seneca, Washingtonian, May 31, 2010

Year of birth missing (living people)
Living people
American male television actors
African-American male actors
People from Forestville, Maryland
Male actors from Maryland
21st-century American male actors
People from Clinton, Maryland
Place of birth missing (living people)